"" ("Merrily my heart shall leap") is a Christian Christmas hymn by Paul Gerhardt, originally in 15 stanzas in artful metre. It was first published, "Frölich sol mein hertze springen", in 1653 in the fifth edition of the hymnal Praxis Pietatis Melica by Johann Crüger, who also created a melody. Johann Sebastian Bach used it as a chorale in his Christmas Oratorio, with a different melody by Johann Georg Ebeling. The song is part, with twelve stanzas, of the current Protestant hymnal Evangelisches Gesangbuch and other songbooks.

Catherine Winkworth translated seven stanzas in 1858 as "All my heart this night rejoices". Other translations also exist.

History 
Paul Gerhardt wrote the lyrics in the first person, describing a personal reaction to the Christmas story. The hymn appeared first in the fifth edition of the hymnal Praxis Pietatis Melica by Johann Crüger in 1653. It appears in a section titled "Von der Geburt Jesu Christ" (Of the birth of Jesus Christ).

The hymn was missing in the 1854 Deutsches Evangelisches Kirchen-Gesangbuch. From the  where it appeared in eleven stanzas, it has remained in the repertory of Protestant church singing. In the current Protestant hymnal Evangelisches Gesangbuch, the song is EG 36. The song is part of several other hymnals and songbooks. It was regarded as ecumenical by the  but was not included in the Catholic hymnal Gotteslob of 2013.

Translations 
Catherine Winkworth translated seven of its twelve stanzas to English as "All my heart this night rejoices", published in the second volume of her Lyra Germanica in 1858. In a 1907 Dictionary of Hymnology. it has been regarded as a "beautiful but rather free translation". Other translations include "Let the voice of glad thanksgiving", of selected stanzas by A. T. Russell, published in the Dalston Hospital Hymn Book in 1848. "All my heart with joy is springing" is a translation of several stanzas by Dr. Kennedy, published in his Hymnologia Christiana in 1863. "Lightly bound my bosom, ringing" is a translation of the complete hymn by Dr. M. Loy, published in the Ohio Lutheran Hymnal in 1880.

Text and theme 
Gerhardt originally wrote 15 stanzas of eight lines each, in an unusual and artful metre. It follows the pattern of a sermon at the time. The text begins saying "I" in a believer's personal statement, for the singer to identify with what is said. It then appeals to a "you", meaning the congregation requested to join in doing so. The song ends in a prayer.

The following table shows Gerhardt's text in the 12 stanzas contained in the Evangelisches Gesangbuch and the translation by Winkworth:

Melodies and settings 

Johann Crüger first published the hymn in 1653 in the fifth edition of his hymnal Praxis Pietatis Melica, with a melody he composed himself. The melody has "leaping" features and modulates often. The last line, in the first stanza saying that Christ is born, moves downward, corresponding to a move from Heaven to Earth. Crüger also wrote a four-part setting. Burkhart M. Schürmann composed a chorale partita of all 15 stanzas, in both German and English (All my heart), for three-part choir in 2010.

The hymn was also sung with a melody which Johann Georg Ebeling created for Gerhardt's "Warum sollt ich mich denn grämen" (EG 370). It appeared in 1666 in Pauli Gerhardi Geistliche Andachten. This melody was used by Bach in a four-part setting in his Christmas Oratorio, in Part III, "Ich will dich mit Fleiß bewahren", reflecting the preceding aria, "Schließe, mein Herze, dies selige Wunder". Bach used the melody also in 1736 in Schemellis Gesangbuch.

Literature 
 Paul Gerhardt: Dichtungen und Schriften. Munich 1957, pp. 1–3.
 Johann Friedrich Bachmann: Paulus Gerhardts geistliche Lieder: historisch-kritische Ausgabe. Oehmigke, Berlin 1866, pp. 95–97.

See also
 List of Christmas carols

References

External links 

 
 
 
 Fröhlich soll mein Herze springen Liederprojekt of SWR2 and Carus-Verlag
 Bach Cantata Translations / BWV 248-III – "Herrscher des Himmels" Emmanuel Music
 All my heart with joy is springing hymntime.com

Lutheran hymns
Hymn tunes
1653 works
17th-century hymns in German
German-language Christmas carols
Hymns by Paul Gerhardt